Let No One Deceive You: Songs of Bertolt Brecht (or simply Let No One Deceive You) is an album by American folk and blues singer Dave Van Ronk and vocalist  Frankie Armstrong, released in 1992. It consists completely of songs by Bertolt Brecht.

Reception

Writing for Allmusic, critic William Ruhlman wrote of the album "These are songs that have been translated from the original German many times, and listeners familiar with them will recognize minor variations from, for example, Marc Blitzstein's English adaptations for The Threepenny Opera. It's actually some of the more obscure songs with music by Hanns Eisler... that are more interesting, since, while often recorded, they are rarely performed in English."

Track listing 
All songs by Bertolt Brecht and Kurt Weill unless otherwise noted.
"Mack the Knife" – 2:30
"The Love Market" (Brecht, Hanns Eisler) – 2:40
"We All Make the Bed That We Lie In – 3:37
"Song Of A German Mother" (Brecht, Eisler) – 3:58
"Lullabies I, II, III/To My Countrymen/Lullaby IV" (Brecht, Eisler) – 3:30
"A Man Is a Man" (Brecht) – 3:20
"The Song of the Little Wind" (Brecht, Eisler) – 2:04
"Let No One Deceive You" – 1:56
"Song of the Moldau" (Brecht, Eisler) – 1:16
"The Legend of the Dead Soldier" (Brecht) – 3:30
"Pirate Jenny" – 4:03
"Alabama Song" – 5:10
"What Keeps a Man Alive?" – 2:47
"Tango Ballad" – 4:37

Personnel

Dave Van Ronk – vocals, guitar
Frankie Armstrong – vocals
Paul Blaney – bass
J. Douglas Dodd – piano
Eric Frandsen – guitar
Leon Rosselson –  guitar, piano

Production notes
Produced by Gary Cristall
Engineered by Simon Garber
Design by Dugg Simpson
Liner notes by John Brazier and Elijah Wald

References

External links
Kurt Weill Foundation discography.

1992 albums
Dave Van Ronk albums
Kurt Weill tribute albums